Alexander Boegschoten (born 15 July 1956 in Hilversum) is a former water polo player from the Netherlands, who won the bronze medal with the Dutch Men's Team at the 1976 Summer Olympics in Montreal, Quebec, Canada.

See also
 Netherlands men's Olympic water polo team records and statistics
 List of Olympic medalists in water polo (men)
 List of men's Olympic water polo tournament goalkeepers

References

External links
 

1956 births
Living people
Sportspeople from Hilversum
Dutch male water polo players
Water polo goalkeepers
Olympic bronze medalists for the Netherlands in water polo
Water polo players at the 1976 Summer Olympics
Medalists at the 1976 Summer Olympics
20th-century Dutch people